"Startup!" (Japanese スタートアップ！) is a Japanese-language song, and the sixth Japanese single, by South Korean boy band  Boyfriend from their 6th Japanese single album of the same name. The single was released physically on May 28, 2014.

Track listing

Music videos

References

Boyfriend (band) songs
2014 songs
2014 singles
Japanese-language songs
Starship Entertainment singles